John Denniston Patton (November 28, 1829 – February 22, 1904) was a U.S. Representative from the state of Pennsylvania.

Patton was born in Indiana, Pennsylvania and attended public school there. He worked in a tannery for several years and then engaged in mercantile pursuits in his hometown. He was elected as a Democrat to the forty-eighth Congress, serving from March 4, 1883 to March 3, 1885. He declined to be a candidate for renomination in 1884, after which he retired from public life. Patton died in Indiana, Pennsylvania and was interred in Oakland Cemetery there.

Sources

The Political Graveyard

1829 births
1904 deaths
Patton, John D.
Democratic Party members of the United States House of Representatives from Pennsylvania
Burials in Pennsylvania
19th-century American politicians